Sinochrostia is a monotypic moth genus of the family Erebidae. Its only species, Sinochrostia sichuanensis, is known from south-eastern China. Both the genus and the species were first described by Michael Fibiger in 2010.

The wingspan is 13–14 mm. The forewing is long and narrow and dark brown costally in the basal, medial, and subterminal areas. Crosslines are absent, except the terminal line, which is marked by dense black interneural spots. Other lines are only indicated by costal spots. The hindwing is light grey and the discal spot is indistinct or absent. The underside of the forewing is dark grey and the underside of the hindwing is grey, with an indistinct discal spot.

References

Micronoctuini
Monotypic moth genera